Lazar Pajović (born 26 August 1991) is a Serbian footballer. He can perform as a centre-back, or as a defensive midfielder eventually.

Club career

Hajduk Beograd
Born in Novi Pazar, Pajović started playing football with local football "AS" academy. In 2007, he joined FK Novi Pazar, and later moved to OFK Beograd, where he completed his youth categories. He has begun his senior career with Hajduk Beograd in 2009 and made 25 Serbian League Belgrade caps for the 2009–10 season. Pajović also continued playing for the club and scored 2 goals for each of the next 2 seasons, collecting 70 league matches with 4 goals at total between 2009 and 2012. After he spent the first half of the 2012–13 season as a member of the Serbian First League side Kolubara without official matches, Pajović returned to Hajduk Beograd, where he spent the rest of season.

Novi Pazar
After he spent the first half of 2013–14 Serbian League Belgrade season playing with FK Sopot, making just 3 league appearances until the winter break off-season, Pajović returned to his home town and joined FK Novi Pazar at the beginning of 2014. Pajović made his Serbian SuperLiga debut for Novi Pazar in the last fixture match of the 2013–14 season, against Radnički Niš, but he got a red card during the first half. Pajović also made 2 league caps for the next season. In summer 2015, Pajović played several friendly matches during the pre-season and scored 1 goal, in 1–0 victory against Velež Mostar. During the regular season, he noted 10 caps for the 2015–16 Serbian SuperLiga season, scoring a goal in the last fixture match against Metalac Gornji Milanovac. In a match Spartak Subotica, played on 15 May 2016, he succeeded a captain armbrand after Irfan Vusljanin was substituted off. Pajović also started 2016–17 season as a starting centre-back, pairing with Miloš Tintor, but after he earned red card in the opening match against Javor Ivanjica, he was replacing by Darko Stanojević from the next fixture match. After Tintor's injury, Pajović returned in squad for the postponed match of the first fixture, against Vojvodina, played on 14 September 2016. Pajović made his first SuperLiga assist in the 17 fixture match of 2016–17 season, against Javor Ivanjica, when he passed a ball to Enver Alivodić for a goal. In summer 2017, Pajović left the club as a free agent.

Borac Čačak
Several days after he left his former club, Pajović joined Borac Čačak on 21 July 2017.

Career statistics

References

External links
 Lazar Pajović stats at utakmica.rs 
 
 
 

1991 births
Living people
Sportspeople from Novi Pazar
Association football defenders
Serbian footballers
Serbian expatriate footballers
FK Hajduk Beograd players
FK Kolubara players
FK Sopot players
FK Novi Pazar players
FK Borac Čačak players
OFK Petrovac players
Serbian SuperLiga players
Serbian First League players
Montenegrin First League players
Serbian expatriate sportspeople in Montenegro
Expatriate footballers in Montenegro